Puhua Investment Co., Ltd. is a Chinese company based in Tai'an, Shandong Province. As at 31 December 2015, state-owned enterprise Potevio owned 39.04% stake as the largest shareholder.

History
Puhua Investment was founded in 2002 as Tai'an Taishan Investment Holding. In 2004 the company was the joint-largest shareholder of the Pacific Securities for 22.56%. In June 2006 it was renamed into Puhua Investment.

Shareholders
As at 31 December 2015, Puhua Investment was majority owned by Potevio (39.04%) and two other companies for 38.16% stake and 22.80% stake respectively. However, Puhua Investment did not appear in the annual report of Potevio as long-term equity investment, while financial assets available for sale was a lump sum figure.

In mid-2015, 20% stake of the company was sold from Taian Fund Investment & Guaranty a subsidiary of Taian Taishan Investment, to another existing shareholder, making the shareholder owned 38.16% as the second largest.

Taishan Huacheng Technology was 99.67% owned by another company, but the stake in Taishan Huacheng Technology also pledged to China Fortune International Trust since May 2015. China Fortune Investment Trust had also set up a private equity fund (a trust) to receive the collateral, and the money raised would lend back to Jiexintai.

The third shareholder  was based in Weifang.

Equity investments
Puhua Investment owned 10.00% stake of the Pacific Securities from 2007 to mid-2011. Puhua Investment disinvested the Pacific Securities to 9.57% in 2011, 8.34% in 2012, 3.18% in 2013. Since 2014 Puhua Investment was out of 10 top shareholders of the Pacific Securities (below the 10th for 1.95%); It was ranked as the second largest shareholder in 2012, behind a consortium of six companies for 25.38% shares.

Puhua Investment also owned 5.30% stake of Taian Bank as the 9th largest shareholder (as at 31 December 2015).

Puhua Investment was the 4th largest shareholder of New Times Securities for 8.5646% shares.

Footnotes

References

External links
  

Government-owned companies of China
Privately held companies of China
Companies based in Shandong
Chinese companies established in 2002
Holding companies of China